John Holman (November 9, 1918 – December 28, 1975) was an American NASCAR owner. He is most famous for his co-ownership of two time NASCAR championship team Holman-Moody with Ralph Moody.

Early career
He was born in Nashville, Tennessee. After the start of World War II, Holman began a career as a tool and die maker and as a shipyard worker. After the war, he became a trucker. He assembled a Mack truck between shipments. He was hired in 1952 by Clay Smith and Bill Stroppe to drive their parts truck to each leg of the 1952 Mexican Road Race, and to stay ahead of the racing team. The team won the race, and they hired Holman as a full-time mechanic and parts man after the race to work in their Long Beach, California shop. Smith was killed in a racing accident at DuQuoin, Illinois in 1954, and Stroppe took over. Holman continued to work for him until 1956. Holman was hired by Ford Motor Company to run their factory shop in Charlotte.

Holman-Moody

Ralph Moody was the mechanic, manager, and star driver of 1925 Indianapolis 500 winner Pete DePaolo's Ford factory-sponsored stockcar racing facility in Charlotte, North Carolina. The drivers formed a partnership after the American Manufacturers' Association banned Ford's factory partication in stockcar racing in June 1957. The move unemployed both men. They decided to pool their resources, and formed Holman-Moody. The team became one of the winningest teams in NASCAR history, after racking up 92 wins and two championships before Moody sold his interests to Holman.

Ironically, Holman-Moody invested in the Bill Stroppe organization in 1965 and the Long Beach facility at 2190 Temple Avenue became Holman-Moody-Stroppe.

Holman died of a heart attack in 1975 while testing a new intercooler.

Career awards
Motorsports Hall of Fame of America (2005)

References

Holman Moody NASCAR owner's statistics
Holman Moody at the Motorsports Hall of Fame of America
"The John Holman Story of the GT40 at LeMans" www.autoquarterly.com/gt40.html 

1918 births
1975 deaths
NASCAR team owners
People from Nashville, Tennessee